Ludovico de Filippi (Turin, 27 September 1872 -Ližnjan, 16 November 1918) was an Italian naval officer and a pioneer of Italian aviation.

He was born on 27 September 1872 and joined the Regia Marina, where he attained the rank frigate captain and received his pilot's license, numbered "5", flying his own aircraft Farman in Mourmelon, France, on 4 July 1910. He later became the first Head Officer of the submarine and aviation department of the Regia Marina. He died on 16 November 1918 while commanding the scout cruiser Cesare Rossarol when she sank after hitting a mine near the city of Ližnjan, on the Istrian Peninsula. He was posthumously awarded the Silver Medal of Military Valor for conduct and bravery.

References

Further reading
Antonellini, Mauro (2008), Salvat ubi lucet : la base idrovolanti di Porto Corsini e i suoi uomini : 1915-1918, Casanova, 245 p.,

External links
The story of the Warship Cesare Rossarol at Adriatic Diving

1872 births
1918 deaths
Recipients of the Silver Medal of Military Valor
Italian aviators